Winckler is a surname. Notable people with the surname include:

Andrew Stuart Winckler (1949–2007), British financial regulator
Arnold von Winckler (1856–1945), Prussian military officer and World War I general
Charles Winckler (1867–1932), Danish athlete and tug of war competitor
Cindy Winckler (born 1950), the Iowa State Representative from the 86th District
Gustav Winckler (1925–1979), Danish singer, composer and music publisher
Gustav Winckler (jurist) (1897–1980), German jurist. 
Heinz Winckler (born 1978), South African singer
Hugo Winckler, (1863–1913), German archaeologist and historian
Ida Winckler (1907–1995), Danish painter and textile artist
Johann Heinrich Winckler (1703–1770), German physicist and philosopher
John R. Winckler (1916–2001), American experimental physicist
Josef Winckler (1881–1966), German novelist
Jutta Hering-Winckler (born 1948), lawyer and patron of music
Llewellyn Winckler (born 1987), Namibian rugby union player
Martin Winckler (born 1955), French writer
William Winckler (born 1964), American actor and independent filmmaker

See also
Winkler (surname)